A curb cut (U.S.), curb ramp, depressed curb, dropped kerb (UK), pram ramp, or kerb ramp (Australia) is a solid (usually concrete) ramp graded down from the top surface of a sidewalk to the surface of an adjoining street. It is designed primarily for pedestrian usage and commonly found in urban areas where pedestrian activity is expected.

History

Historically speaking, footpaths were finished at right angles to the street surface with conventional curb treatments. The introduction of them to help people pushing prams dates back at least as far as the 1930s in the UK.

Kalamazoo, Michigan installed curb cuts in the 1940s as a pilot project to aid employment of veterans with disabilities. A major project in Berkeley, California led by the grassroots Center for Independent Living led to curb cuts up and down Telegraph and Shattuck Avenues creating an extensive path of travel. Following this, the value of curb cuts was promoted more strongly and their installment was often made on a voluntary basis by municipal authorities and developers. 

Curb cuts in Western countries have been mandated by legislation such as the Americans with Disabilities Act of 1990 (ADA) in the United States (which requires that curb cuts be present on all sidewalks) or the Disability Discrimination Act 1992 in Australia. The legislative requirements in some jurisdictions have been increased from the original requirements in recent times, to the point where existing treatments can now fail to meet the most recent design requirements.

Supporters of curb cut requirements point to mandatory curb cuts as an example of disability rights legislation that can benefit every user of public spaces, and not just people with disabilities.

Users and uses

Curb cuts placed at street intersections allow wheelchair users, toddlers on tricycles etc., to move onto or off of a sidewalk with less difficulty. Many curb cuts also feature tactile paving, a pattern of circular bumps that indicate to visually impaired pedestrians that they are about to enter a roadway.

Curb cuts also benefit pedestrians if they are using a walker or cane or wheelchair, pushing a stroller, a pram or a buggy for babies, pushing or pulling a cart or hand truck, or walking next to a bicycle; as well as anyone riding a bicycle, roller skates, or a skateboard.

Other curb cuts
A wider curb cut is also useful for motor vehicles to enter a driveway or parking lot on the other side of a sidewalk.

Smaller curb cuts may be used along streets, parking areas or sidewalks in the manner of a water bar; by redirecting water from traditional drainage ways to stormwater BMPs which allow infiltration, such as a grassed area or rain garden.

Design
Accessible curb cuts transition from the low side of a curb to the high side (usually 15 cm change in level). Accessible curb ramps are a minimum of 1 metre wide. They are sloped no greater than 1:12 (8.33%), which means that for every 12 cm of horizontal distance, they rise no more than one centimetre. The concrete curb ramp is sometimes scored with grooves, the texture of which may serve as a warning to vision-impaired persons of the transition to the street.  Such grooves also allow for traction and water runoff, and may be stained a color that significantly contrasts with the adjacent concrete. If a curb ramp contains flared sides, they are usually no greater than 1:10 slope.

Pram ramps in Australia are designed according to Australian Standard AS 1428: Design for access and mobility.

Universal design 
Proponents of universal design often point to the curb cut as a prime example when raising awareness of the benefits of this design philosophy.

References

Accessible building
Pedestrian infrastructure
Road infrastructure
Street furniture
Pedestrian crossings